Ōpōtiki (from Ōpōtiki-Mai-Tawhiti) is a town in the eastern Bay of Plenty in the North Island of New Zealand. It houses the headquarters of the Ōpōtiki District Council, the mayor of Ōpōtiki and comes under the Bay of Plenty Regional Council.

Geography 
The town of Ōpōtiki is situated exactly on latitude 38° South. The climate is temperate. Summer temperatures reach the mid-20s (Celsius, mid-70s Fahrenheit) on the coast and encourage a continuation of the beach culture of the Bay of Plenty. Winter days are often cloudless, the daytime temperature never drops below freezing but there may be a mild frost at night. Winter snow falls along the crest of the ranges, and on the higher peaks (over 1000 m) may remain for a few weeks. Rain occurs at any season. Severe localised rainstorms ('cloudbursts') may occur in the high country and have caused flash flooding including past inundations of Ōpōtiki township.

Demographics

Ōpōtiki had a population of 4,806 at the 2018 New Zealand census, an increase of 735 people (18.1%) since the 2013 census, and an increase of 363 people (8.2%) since the 2006 census. There were 1,539 households, comprising 2,337 males and 2,472 females, giving a sex ratio of 0.95 males per female, with 1,221 people (25.4%) aged under 15 years, 921 (19.2%) aged 15 to 29, 1,920 (40.0%) aged 30 to 64, and 744 (15.5%) aged 65 or older.

Ethnicities were 46.7% European/Pākehā, 67.9% Māori, 4.2% Pacific peoples, 3.7% Asian, and 1.1% other ethnicities. People may identify with more than one ethnicity.

The percentage of people born overseas was 8.2, compared with 27.1% nationally.

Although some people chose not to answer the census's question about religious affiliation, 41.9% had no religion, 30.7% were Christian, 18.0% had Māori religious beliefs, 0.6% were Hindu, 0.3% were Muslim, 0.1% were Buddhist and 2.1% had other religions.

Of those at least 15 years old, 303 (8.5%) people had a bachelor's or higher degree, and 1,029 (28.7%) people had no formal qualifications. 174 people (4.9%) earned over $70,000 compared to 17.2% nationally. The employment status of those at least 15 was that 1,530 (42.7%) people were employed full-time, 480 (13.4%) were part-time, and 300 (8.4%) were unemployed.

Amenities

Marae
Maromahue Marae and Te Poho o Kahungunu meeting house is a traditional meeting place of the Whakatōhea hapū of Te Ūpokorehe. In October 2020, the Government committed $364,597 from the Provincial Growth Fund to upgrade the marae, creating 16 jobs.

Te Rere Marae and Te Iringa meeting house is a meeting place of the Whakatōhea hapū of Ngāti Ngahere. In October 2020, the Government committed $744,574 to upgrade it and two other marae, creating 30 jobs.

Rongopopoia Marae, also known as Te Kahikatea Marae, is a meeting place of the Tūhoe hapū of Upokorehe.

Museum

Opotiki Heritage and Agricultural Society runs a museum in Ōpōtiki. It opened in 2001.

Transport and infrastructure 
Ōpōtiki is situated at the northern junction of State Highway 2 and State Highway 35. To the west, State Highway 2 connects Ōpotiki to Whakatāne, Rotorua and Tauranga. To the south and east, State Highway 2 provides a direct inland route to Gisborne, while State Highway 35 follows the coast via Te Araroa.

Horizon Networks owns and operates the electricity distribution network in Ōpōtiki, with electricity fed from Transpower's national grid at its Waiotahi substation.

Natural gas arrived in Ōpōtiki in 1984, as part of the construction of the Kawerau to Gisborne high-pressure pipeline. Today, First Gas owns and operates both the high-pressure pipeline and the local distribution network supplying the town.

Education

Notable people

James Rolleston, an actor known for his role in Boy and Vodafone NZ advertisements, lives and was raised in Ōpōtiki.

Notes

References
 M. Heginbotham & A.E. Esler, "Wild vascular plants of the Opotiki-East Cape region, North Island, New Zealand". NZ Journal of Botany, 1985, vol. 23: 379–406.

External links

 The council's site
 Ōpōtiki Information Centre

 Photo of Ōpōtiki-Gisborne Road c1928
 Photo of Captain Porter and Maori auxiliaries at Ōpōtiki 1871

Ōpōtiki District
Populated places in the Bay of Plenty Region
Territorial authorities of New Zealand